14 Canis Minoris, also known as HD 65345, is a single star in the equatorial constellation of Canis Minor. It is faintly visible to the naked eye with an apparent visual magnitude of +5.30. It is moving further from the Sun with  heliocentric radial velocity of +42.6 km/s.

This is an evolved G-type giant star with a stellar classification of G8 IIIb. At the age of around 550 million years old, it is a red clump giant, which means it has already undergone helium flash and is generating energy through helium fusion at its core. The star has an estimated 2.5 times the mass of the Sun and has expanded to 8.7 times the Sun's radius. It is radiating roughly 48 times the Sun's luminosity from its enlarged photosphere at an effective temperature of 5,070 K.

References

G-type giants
Horizontal-branch stars
Canis Minor
Durchmusterung objects
Canis Minoris, 14
065345
038962
3110